Pennsylvania House of Representatives District 8 is located in Western Pennsylvania and has been represented by Aaron Bernstine since 2023.

District profile 
The 8th Pennsylvania House of Representatives District is located in Butler County and Lawrence County and includes the following areas: 

Butler County

 Brady Township
 Center Township
 Clay Township
Connoquenessing
 Connoquenessing Township
Forward Township
Franklin Township
Lancaster Township
Middlesex Township
Muddycreek Township
Penn Township
Portersville
Prospect
West Liberty
West Sunbury
Worth Township

Lawrence County

Ellport
Ellwood City (Lawrence County Portion)
Enon Valley
 Little Beaver Township
New Beaver
Perry Township
Plain Grove Township
Scott Township
Slippery Rock Township
Volant
Wampum
Washington Towsnhip
Wayne Township

Representatives

Recent election results 

18,360

References

External links
District map from the United States Census Bureau
Pennsylvania House Legislative District Maps from the Pennsylvania Redistricting Commission.  
Population Data for District 44 from the Pennsylvania Redistricting Commission.

Government of Allegheny County, Pennsylvania
8